Monaville is an unincorporated community in Lake Villa Township, Lake County, Illinois, United States. Monaville is located at the junction of County Routes 18A and 65V near the southern border of Lake Villa.

References

Unincorporated communities in Illinois
Chicago metropolitan area
Unincorporated communities in Lake County, Illinois